Jibali or Djibali may refer to:
 something related to Jibal, a historical region in western Iran
 Jibbali language, a Modern South Arabian language of Oman
 Jebali, an Arabic name (including a list of people with the name)
 Djibali, Burkina Faso, a village in Burkina Faso

See also 
 Jabali, a character in Hindu mythology